Efo Kodjo Mawugbe (21 April 1954 – 14 September 2011 ) was a Ghanaian award-winning playwright and director of the National Theatre of Ghana. He was also a judge of TV3's Ghana's Most Beautiful Television show. Efo Kodjo Mawugbe as started a theatre company called Theater Kilimanjaro in the early 90s.

Education 
Efo Kodjo Mawugbe was a student of Mawuli School where he got his General Certificate of Education (GCE) Ordinary and Advanced Levels before proceeding to study Theatre Arts at the University of Ghana from 1975 to 1978. He later studied a certificate programme in Theatre Management and Audience Development at the British Council in Glasgow and London.  In 1991, Mawugbe pursued a certificate course in Senior Management Development at the Ghana Institute of Public Management (GIMPA). He also studied at the Bauff Centre for Management, Calgary, Canada in 1995.

Selected works 

 In the Chest of a Woman (Play), Isaac Books & Stationery Services, 2008.
 My Father's Song (Fiction), Afram Publications, 2015.
 Prison Graduates, Afram Publications, 2015

Awards 
Efo Kodjo Mawugbe was awarded in the BBC World Service and British Council International Radio Playwriting Competition 2009 for his play, Prison Graduates.

References 

20th-century short story writers
2011 deaths
Academic staff of the University of Ghana
Ghanaian male poets
Ewe people
Mawuli School alumni
20th-century Ghanaian poets
20th-century novelists
1954 births
University of Ghana alumni
Ghana Institute of Management and Public Administration alumni